Nathan Reuvers (born September 30, 1998) is an American professional basketball player for Pallacanestro Reggiana of the Lega Basket Serie A. He played college basketball for the Wisconsin Badgers.

High school career
Reuvers played basketball for Lakeville North High School in Lakeville, Minnesota. Reuvers also played soccer as a goalkeeper in high school but began focusing on basketball after drawing NCAA Division I interest as a sophomore in the latter sport. In his junior season, he averaged 19.8 points and 8.2 rebounds per game, helping his team reach the Class 4A state title game. As a senior, Reuvers averaged 25.6 points, 12.3 rebounds and 3.5 blocks per game, leading Lakeville North to a 24–2 record and the Class 4A state quarterfinals. He was a finalist for the Minnesota Mr. Basketball award. By the end of his career, Reuvers ranked second in school history in career points (1,619), behind J. P. Macura.

Recruiting
On May 18, 2016, after his junior season, Reuvers committed to play college basketball for Wisconsin over 24 Division I offers, including Minnesota. He was considered a four-star recruit by major recruiting services. Reuvers chose the Badgers because coach Greg Gard and his assistants had sold him on Wisconsin's history of developing big men, particularly Frank Kaminsky and Jon Leuer.

College career
Reuvers initially planned on redshirting his freshman year, but coach Gard put him in the lineup five games into the season due to a lack of production from their junior forwards. In his debut against Milwaukee, Reuvers missed all six shots but had six rebounds and two assists. As a freshman, he averaged 5.3 points and 2.0 rebounds per game and made 15 starts. Following the season he increased his weight from 215 to 240 pounds, working with the strength and conditioning coach to add muscle to become more physical. Reuvers posted his first double-double of 22 points and 10 rebounds in a win at Illinois on January 23, 2019. He averaged 7.9 points, 3.9 rebounds, 1.0 assists, and a team-leading 1.8 blocks per game as a sophomore.

Coming into his junior season, Reuvers was expected to help replace the production of the graduating Ethan Happ. In the season debut, he matched a career-high 22 points along with six rebounds and four blocks in a 65–63 overtime loss to Saint Mary's. Reuvers nearly had a triple-double on November 8, 2019, compiling 14 points, 14 rebounds and nine blocks in a 65–52 win over Eastern Illinois. He was named Big Ten player of the week on November 11. On December 21, 2020, Reuvers scored 22 points in an 83–64 win against Milwaukee. After the addition of Micah Potter to the lineup in the Milwaukee game, Reuvers's offensive efficiency declined during the beginning of the conference season, shooting 3 of 12 from the field against Ohio State but still leading the team with 17 points. Reuvers helped Wisconsin win a share of the Big Ten regular-season title and led the team in scoring (13.1 points per game) and blocks (1.9 per game) and also pulled down 4.5 rebounds per game. He was named to the Third Team All-Big Ten by the coaches and media. As a senior, Reuvers averaged 8.3 points, 3.3 rebounds, and 1.3 blocks per game, becoming Wisconsin's all-time leader in blocked shots. He announced he was turning professional after the season and hired an agent.

Professional career
On July 24, 2021, Reuvers signed his first professional contract with Cibona in the Croatian League and the ABA League. He joined the Cleveland Cavaliers for the 2022 NBA Summer League.

Career statistics

College

|-
| style="text-align:left;"| 2017–18
| style="text-align:left;"| Wisconsin
| 28 || 15 || 16.6 || .382 || .255 || .833 || 2.0 || .8 || .3 || .9 || 5.3
|-
| style="text-align:left;"| 2018–19
| style="text-align:left;"| Wisconsin
| 34 || 34 || 22.9 || .449 || .381 || .634 || 3.9 || 1.0 || .3 || 1.8 || 7.9
|-
| style="text-align:left;"| 2019–20
| style="text-align:left;"| Wisconsin
| 31 || 31 || 26.2 || .448 || .337 || .786 || 4.5 || .6 || .5 || 1.9 || 13.1
|-
| style="text-align:left;"| 2020–21
| style="text-align:left;"| Wisconsin
| 31 || 24 || 21.0 || .420 || .286 || .780 || 3.3 || .7 || .3 || 1.3 || 8.3
|- class="sortbottom"
| style="text-align:center;" colspan="2"| Career 
| 124 || 104 || 21.8 || .431 || .325 || .761 || 3.5 || .8 || .3 || 1.5 || 8.7

Personal life
Reuvers is the youngest of five children of Theresa and Paul Reuvers. In his youth, Reuvers frequently got into fights with his next oldest brother, Jonathan.

References

External links
 ABA League bio
 realGM bio
 Wisconsin Badgers bio

1998 births
Living people
ABA League players
American expatriate basketball people in Croatia
American men's basketball players
Basketball players from Minnesota
KK Cibona players
Pallacanestro Reggiana players
People from Lakeville, Minnesota
Power forwards (basketball)
Wisconsin Badgers men's basketball players